John Meredith Steel (born 27 October 1972 in Auckland) is a former freestyle swimmer from New Zealand, who competed at two consecutive Summer Olympics for his native country, starting in 1992 in Barcelona, Spain.

Steel won two silver medals (4 × 100 m Freestyle and 4 × 200 m Freestyle) at the 1994 Commonwealth Games in Victoria, British Columbia, Canada. Four years earlier Steel captured the bronze medal with the Men's 4x200 Freestyle Relay Team at the 1990 Commonwealth Games in his hometown of Auckland. Steel now works for Air NZ as a flight attendant.

Despite being from New Zealand he won the 1990 'Open' ASA National Championship 100 metres freestyle title.

See also
 List of Commonwealth Games medallists in swimming (men)

References
 Profile on NZ Olympic Committee

1972 births
Living people
New Zealand male freestyle swimmers
Swimmers at the 1990 Commonwealth Games
Swimmers at the 1992 Summer Olympics
Swimmers at the 1994 Commonwealth Games
Swimmers at the 1996 Summer Olympics
Olympic swimmers of New Zealand
Swimmers from Auckland
Commonwealth Games silver medallists for New Zealand
Commonwealth Games bronze medallists for New Zealand
Commonwealth Games medallists in swimming
Medallists at the 1990 Commonwealth Games
Medallists at the 1994 Commonwealth Games